Walter Schultz (August 20, 1900 in Grevesmühlen - June 26, 1957 in Schnackenburg) was a German theologian who was Landeskirchenführer in Mecklenburg 1933–1945, and bishop in Mecklenburg 1934–45.

1900 births
1957 deaths
20th-century German Lutheran bishops